The Piano Trio, WoO 38, in E-flat major is a composition for piano trio by Ludwig van Beethoven, that was discovered amongst Beethoven's papers following his death. It is believed to have been composed in either 1790 or 1791. More conventional in nature than the Piano Trios Op.1, the composition was not published until 1830 by F. P. Dunst in Frankfurt, along with the Allegretto for Piano Trio in B-flat major, WoO 39, and Piano Sonata in C major, WoO 51.

Background

Beethoven is believed to have worked on this trio shortly before he left Bonn for Vienna in 1792. The precise circumstances of composition are not known and the work remained unpublished until after the composer died in 1827. When F. P. Dunst published the work in 1830, the publication included a statement to the effect that the work was Beethoven's, signed by Carl Czerny, Anton Diabelli and Ferdinand Ries. At that time the manuscript was stated to be held by Anton Schindler, but, according to Cooper it is now lost.

Movements

The composition is in three movements, all in the key of E-flat major:

 Allegro moderato
 Scherzo: Allegro ma non troppo
 Rondo: Allegretto

A typical performance takes around 13 to 15 minutes.

Notes and references
Notes

References

Sources

Further reading

External links

, performed by Nahuel Chiarella (violin), Luis Palacios (cello) & Maximiliano Ferreyra (piano)
 (ensemble as above)

Piano trios by Ludwig van Beethoven
1790 compositions
Compositions in E-flat major
Compositions by Ludwig van Beethoven published posthumously